Microleve was a Brazilian aircraft manufacturer based in Rio de Janeiro. Founded in 1982 at the beginning of the ultralight boom years, the company appears to have gone out of business in about 2011. The company specialized in the design and manufacture of ultralight aircraft.

Microleve was the first microlight manufacturer in Brazil and for many years was the largest manufacturer of ultralight aircraft in Latin America. The company exported its own designs and also imported designs by other companies, notably those of Tecnam of Italy.

Aircraft

References

External links
Microleve website archives on Archive.org

Defunct aircraft manufacturers of Brazil
Defunct manufacturing companies of Brazil
Manufacturing companies based in Rio de Janeiro (city)